Carolina Wikström (born 4 September 1993) is a Swedish long-distance runner. She competed in the women's marathon at the 2020 Summer Olympics held in Tokyo, Japan.

In 2020, she competed in the women's half marathon at the World Athletics Half Marathon Championships held in Gdynia, Poland.

She also competed in the women's marathon at the 2022 World Athletics Championships held in Eugene, Oregon, United States.

She won the 2022 edition of the Tjejmilen competition.

References

External links 
 

Living people
1993 births
Place of birth missing (living people)
Swedish female long-distance runners
Swedish female marathon runners
Athletes (track and field) at the 2020 Summer Olympics
Olympic athletes of Sweden
21st-century Swedish women